The American University of Rome (commonly referred to as AUR) is a degree-granting American university in Rome, Italy. AUR is accredited by the Middle States Commission on Higher Education in the United States and is recognized by the Italian Ministry of Education as an American University duly authorized to operate in Italy as a Foreign Higher Education Institution. The American University of Rome's degrees, accompanied by a Statement of Comparability or a Dichiarazione di Valore (Certified Degree Equivalency) is valid for admission to Italian graduate degree programs such as the laurea magistrale or Italian first level Master programs.

The school was founded in 1969, making it the oldest American degree-granting university in Rome. AUR is situated near the center of Rome on the Janiculum hill in the Monteverde Vecchio neighborhood, and has a total student enrollment of around 600. The language of instruction is English.

History 
AUR has its origins soon after World War II. David Colin, an American journalist in Italy prior to and during the war, settled in Rome. While American students and professors visited Rome, Colin helped foster cultural exchanges between Americans and their Italian counterparts. Over time, informal discussions at his home became more formalized, turning into structured lectures and classes. His wife, Joan Carpenter, assisted Colin with this undertaking.

George Tesoro, an Italian who left Italy in 1940 in protest against Mussolini's fascist regime, began to collaborate with Colin. As the program grew, The American University in Rome became reality when AUR was incorporated in 1969 in the District of Columbia with its academic headquarters located in Rome, Italy.

Later development 
Upon incorporation, Tesoro served as chairman until 1983, when Joseph D. Ventura, then vice chair, succeeded him. During Ventura's time as chairman, the board of trustees became a degree-granting institution from the District of Columbia in 1986. In 1987, a member of the board,  Dr. Margaret Giannini, a professional in the scientific and medical research field, became board chair and served until 2003. Under her 16 years of leadership, the university grew in its student and faculty numbers, curriculum offerings, and financial and management systems. Dr. Giannini initiated AUR's first accreditation with the Accrediting Council of Independent Colleges and Schools in 1992 and planted the seeds for Middle States accreditation.

After operating from different locations in central Rome for almost 25 years, AUR moved to its current campus in 1993.

Campus
The campus is located on top of the Janiculum, Rome's highest hill, offering views of the city. Most of its buildings are located on Via Pietro Roselli adjacent to a portion of the Aurelian Wall with the Communications Building, commonly known as the Carini building, being located on Via Carini, only a short walk.

The Carini building, completed in 1970, is after the style of the Italian architect Paolo Portoghesi and has been commonly referred to as Casa Papanice. However, after some dispute, it has been acknowledged that the original Casa Papanice is another building in Rome and the Carini building of The American University of Rome cannot be officially designated as a Portoghesi building but a building 'in the style of'.

The campus was extended in early 2018 to include an Art Studio, exhibition space and classrooms on via Angelo Masina. This building is adjacent to, and shares garden space with, the American Academy in Rome.

The main campus includes two gardens centered around the main A and B buildings, the Evans Hall Library, and the Auriana Auditorium. The main teaching block (Building B) is part of a Barnabite monastery.

Organisation and administration 
The American University of Rome is governed a board of trustees, president, and a senate. The highest governing body, the board of trustees, is responsible for overseeing the university and maintaining its academic and financial health and welfare. Among other duties, the board appoints the president and has final approval of changes to the curriculum proposed by the AUR Senate (the body which, forms and amends academic policies and includes a student government representative).

The current president of the university is Dr. Scott Sprenger  who assumed the position in July 2020, taking over from Dr. Richard Hodges OBE, who was named President Emeritus & Professor Emeritus upon completing his tenure.

AUR is a member of the Association of American International Colleges and Universities and The American International Consortium of Academic Libraries (AMICAL).

Academics 
The American University of Rome is a liberal arts university with a student-faculty ratio of roughly 16:1. AUR's undergraduate student body of roughly 500 students is multicultural and representative of over 30 nationalities.

Accreditation 
The American University of Rome is regionally accredited by the Middle States Commission on Higher Education, which is an institutional accrediting agency recognized by the U.S. Secretary of Education and the Council for Higher Education Accreditation.
The American University of Rome is licensed by the Department of Education of the State of Delaware to award associate, bachelor's and master's degrees. In Italy, AUR is registered as a legal entity with the Rome Tribunal and it is authorized to operate in Italy by the Ministry of Education, Universities and Research.

Academic programs 
AUR offers three master's degrees (in Peace Studies, Sustainable Cultural Heritage and Food Studies) and ten bachelor's degree programs with 16 concentrations or tracks, two associate degree programs and 18 minors. Of the ten undergraduate programs nine are Bachelor of Arts degrees. The Program of Business Administration offers a Bachelor of Science Degree in Business Administration. Associate of Arts Degrees can be obtained in liberal arts and international business. Internships are available in all majors for course credit and provide a practical format to relate their studies to career interests.

The university's programs and areas include:

Archeology and Classics
Art History
Business Administration
Communication and English
English, Writing, Literature and Publishing
Film and Digital Media
Fine Arts
Interdisciplinary Studies
International Relations and Global Politics
Travel and Tourism Management

The university also offers four master (M.A.) degree programs:

Arts Management
Food Studies
Peace Studies
Sustainable Cultural Heritage

The Rula Jebreal Scholarship Fund 
AUR together with Rula Jebreal (award-winning journalist, author, and foreign policy analyst) started the Rula Jebreal Scholarship Fund in 2015. The scholarship fund has been designed to directly respond to the global migration crisis, a crisis that is particularly affecting Italy. In 2017, AUR brought three students from Beirut to study in Rome and since then the project has expanded to provide tuition and living costs for six further students from conflict-torn countries (Syria, Palestine, Eswatini, and Egypt).

Student life
Students live off-campus mostly near the university, giving the opportunity to allow the students to immerse in the surrounding communities.

The AUR community of students and faculty publishes a literary journal of student works called Remus each year. A monthly student run newspaper called "the Howler" is now being published. AUR student run organisations include Student Government and a variety of clubs such as: Veterans Club, Business Club, Communication Club, Culture Club, Italian Studies Club, and International Relations Club which also organises AUR's Harvard National Model United Nations delegation. The Communication club also supports AUR's Communication Week which is a showcase of the American University of Rome students communications and English  work.

Athletics 
The Wolves and She-Wolves are the American University of Rome's soccer clubs which play competitively against Rome's other universities including La Sapienza and Roma Tre University. Both AUR's men's and women's teams were founding members of their respective intercollegiate tournaments; the men's "Campionato di Calcio delle Università Romane" (2005)    and the women's "Campionato Calcio Feminile delle Università Romane" in 2006.

AUR Wolves, men's soccer team, won the Universities of Rome a5 Football Championship on April 26, 2018, their first trophy since co-founding the league in 2005.

In 2013, the university added volleyball as a competitive team and became a founding member in the newly created co-ed tournament, "Campionato di Volley delle Università Romane"

Mascot
The school mascot is "Wolfie". The first mascot in Roman university athletics, Wolfie has been representing AUR since 2006. Originally named "Romulus" in reference to the mythical founder of Rome, the name Wolfie was popularized by students and later formally adopted.

American University of Rome Abroad (AURA)
The American University of Rome hosts a number of study abroad students but also promotes the opportunity for resident students to study abroad from AUR using the AURA program. Partnering institutions that accept AUR students to study abroad with them include:

American University (AU), Washington, DC
Drexel University, Philadelphia, PA
Emory University (Goizueta School of Business), Atlanta, GA
Florida Atlantic University, Boca Raton, FL
iCLA - International College of Liberal Arts, Yamanashi Gakuin University, Yamanashi, Japan
International School of Management (ISM), Dortmund, Frankfurt, Munich, Hamburg, Cologne, Stuttgart – Germany
LIM College, New York, NY
Marymount University, Arlington, VA
University of Maryland, College Park, MD
University of Miami, Coral Gables, FL
University of Westminster (School of Media, Arts & Design), London - U.K.
Vesalius College, Brussels – Belgium

Through the AAICU Direct Educational Exchange Program (AAICU-DEEP) (Association of American International Colleges and Universities) students can apply to study abroad for a semester at:

American College of Thessaloniki 
American University of Bulgaria
American University of Armenia
American University of Central Asia 
American University of Nigeria
American University of Sharjah
Al Akhawayn University, Ifrane, Morocco
Central European University, Hungary
Franklin College, Switzerland
Forman Christian College University, Lahore
Haigaizian University, Lebanon
Institute for American Universities (Aix-en-Provence)
Irish American University
Lebanese American University
Saint Louis University, Madrid
The American College of Greece
The American University in Cairo
The American University of Afghanistan
The American University of Beirut
The American University in Kosovo
The American University of Paris

Notable scholars and honorary degree recipients 
Stanley Tucci
James Murdoch
Colin Renfrew
James Walston
Rula Jebreal
Parker W. Borg
Bjorn Thomassen
David Thorne
Ronald P. Spogli
Hage Geingob
Andrea Camilleri
Roger Waters
Donna Shalala
Francesco Guccini
Mary Beard
Aurelio De Laurentiis
Piero Angela
Andrea di Robilant
Richard Hodges (Archaeologist)

See also
American University (disambiguation) for a list of similarly named institutions

References

External links 
The American University of Rome

Universities in Italy
Universities and colleges in Rome
Rome R. XIII Trastevere
Educational institutions established in 1969
1969 establishments in Italy